Fudbalski klub Ljubić (Serbian Cyrillic: Фудбалски клуб Љубић Пpњaвop) is a football club from the town of Prnjavor, in Republika Srpska, Bosnia and Herzegovina. The club competes in the First League of the Republika Srpska.

Players

Current squad

HistoricaL list of managers
 Brane Janković
 Branimir Tulić
 Milan Vujasin
 Srboljub Nikolić
 Vlado Jagodić
 Milorad Segić
 Darko Maletić
 Nikola Zeljković

References

External links
FK Ljubić Prnjavor at footlive.

Football clubs in Republika Srpska
Football clubs in Bosnia and Herzegovina
Association football clubs established in 1946
1946 establishments in Bosnia and Herzegovina